David Lee Hull (15 June 1935 – 11 August 2010) was an American philosopher who was most notable for founding the field philosophy of biology. Additionally, Hull is recognized within evolutionary culture studies as contributing heavily in early discussions of the conceptualization of memetics. In addition to his academic prominence, he was well known as a gay man who fought for the rights of other gay and lesbian philosophers. Hull was partnered with Richard "Dick" Wellman, a Chicago school teacher, until Wellman's passing during the drafting of Science as Process.

Education and career
Hull initially got a Bachelors in Biology at Illinois Wesleyan University. He then became one of the first graduates of the History and Philosophy of Science department at Indiana University (IU). After earning his PhD from IU, he taught at the University of Wisconsin–Milwaukee for 20 years before moving to Northwestern, where he taught for another 20 years.  Hull was a former president of the Philosophy of Science Association, the ISHPSSB, and the Society for Systematic Biology.  He was particularly well known for his argument that species are not sets or collections but rather spatially and temporally extended individuals (also called the individuality thesis or "species-as-individuals" thesis).

He is considered to have founded and systematically developed the area of philosophy of biology as it is understood in contemporary philosophy. Hull proposed an elaborate discussion of science as an evolutionary process in his 1988 book, which also offered a historical account of the "taxonomy wars" of the 1960s and 1970s between three competing schools of taxonomy: phenetics, evolutionary systematics, and cladistics. In Hull's view, science evolves like organisms and populations do, with a demic population structure, subject to selection for ideas based on "conceptual inclusive credit." Either novelty or citation of work gives credit, and the professional careers of scientists share in credit by using successful research. This is a "hidden hand" account of scientific progress.

Additionally, Hull regularly contributed to a variety of studies of evolutionary culture. He contributed to philosophical and empirical accounts of the evolution of science and evolutionary epistemology. While most of his work is in metaphysics and epistemology of evolution and biology, some of his work is closely related to what has since been called Bibliometrics, Scientometrics, or Science of Science. He forwarded citation analysis to develop an account of the evolutionary survival of scientific ideas which has a direct relationship to what has been called Knowledge Memes or Science Memes. 

He also contributed to evolutionary culture theory more broadly by contributing to initial discussions surrounding the generalization of Richard Dawkins' evolutionary vehicles in memetics research. In relation to Richard Dawkins' theory of replicators, Hull introduced the notion of interactors.

He was Dressler Professor in the Humanities Emeritus at Northwestern University.

Bibliography
Hull, D. L. (1964) Consistency and monophyly. Syst. Zool. 13:1-11.
Hull, D. L. (1965) The effect of essentialism on taxonomy:  two thousand years of stasis. Br. J. Philos. Sci. 15:  314-326; 16:  1-18.
Hull, D. L. (1966) Phylogenetic numericlature. Syst. Zool. 15:14-17.
Hull, D. L. (1967) Certainty and circularity in evolutionary taxonomy. Evolution 21:174-189.
Hull, D. L. (1968) The operational imperative—sense and nonsense in operationalism. Syst. Zool. 17:438-457.
Hull, D. L. (1969) Morphospecies and biospecies:  a reply to Ruse. Br. J. Philos. Sci. 20:280-282.
Hull, D. L. (1970) Contemporary systematic philosophies. Annu. Rev. Ecol. Syst. 1:19-54.
Hull, D. L. (1973) Darwin and His Critics: The Reception of Darwin's Theory of Evolution by the Scientific Community. Cambridge, MA: Harvard University Press; reprinted by the University of Chicago Press, 1983, .
Hull, D. L. (1974) Philosophy of Biological Science. Englewood Cliffs: Prentice-Hall, ; translated into Portuguese (1975), Japanese (1994).
Hull, D. L. (1976) Are species really individuals? Syst. Zool. 25:174-191.
Hull, D. L. (1978) A matter of individuality. Philos. Sci. 45:335-360.
Hull, D. L. (1978) The principles of biological classification:  the use and abuse of philosophy. Vol. 2, pp. 130–153. Proceedings of the Biennial Meeting of the Philosophy of Science Association.
Hull, D. L. (1979) The limits of cladism. Syst. Zool. 28:416-440.
Hull, D. L. (1980) Individuality and selection. Annu. Rev. Ecol. Syst. 11:311-332.
Hull, D. L. (1981) Kitts and Kitts and Caplan on species. Philos. Sci. 48:141-152.
Hull, D. L. (1981) Metaphysics and common usage. Behav. Brain Sci. 4:290-291.
Hull, D. L. (1983) Karl Popper and Plato's metaphor. pp. 177–189 in N. I. Platnick, and V. A. Funk, eds. Advances in Cladistics, Vol. 2 Columbia University Press, New York.
Hull, D. L. (1983) Thirty-one years of Systematic Zoology. Syst. Zool. 32:315-342.
Hull, D. L. (1984) Cladistic theory:  hypotheses that blur and grow. pp. 5–23 in T. Duncan, and T. F. Stuessy, eds. Cladistics:  perspectives on the reconstruction of evolutionary history. Columbia University Press, New York.
Hull, D. L. 1984. Can Kripke alone save essentialism?  A reply to Kitts. Syst. Zool. 33:110-112.
Hull, D. L. (1988) Science as a Process: An Evolutionary Account of the Social and Conceptual Development of Science  Chicago: University of Chicago Press, .
Hull, D. L. (1989) The Metaphysics of Evolution.  Stony Brook NY: State University of New York Press, .
Hull, D. L. (1992) "Review of The Scientific Attitude" Current Comments 15 (September 28): 149–154.
Hull, D. L. (1997) The ideal species concept—and why we can't get it. pp. 357–380 in M. F. Claridge, H. A. Dawah, and M. R. Wilson, eds. Species:  the units of biodiversity. Chapman & Hall, London.
Hull, D. L. (1999) The use and abuse of Sir Karl Popper. Biol. & Philos. 14:481-504.
Hull, D. L. (1999) "Evolutionists red in tooth and claw" Nature, 398 (April): 385.
Hull, D. L. (2000) "Activism, scientists and sociobiology" Nature 407 (6805): 673–674
Hull, D. L. (2001) "Replicators and interactors" In his Science and Selection. Cambridge, UK: Cambridge University Press, pp. 13–32.
Hull, D. L. (2001) The role of theories in biological systematics. Stud. Hist. Phil. Biol. & Biomed. Sci. 32:221-238.
Hull, D. L. (2002) Words and words about species. Evolution 56:426-428.
Hull, D. L. (2002a) "A career in the glare of public acclaim" Bioscience 52 (September): 837–841.
Hull, D. L. (2002b) "Explanatory styles in science" American Scientist, September.
Hull, D. L., R. Langman and S. Glenn (2001) "A general account of selection: biology, immunology and behavior" Behavioral and Brain Sciences 24 (3): 511–528.
Hull, D. L. and M. Ruse, eds., (1998) The Philosophy of Biology Cambridge UK: Cambridge University Press, .

See also
 American philosophy
 List of American philosophers

References

External links

David Hull Publications
David Hull's Natural Philosophy of Science – by Paul E. Griffiths
The Evolution of a Proof: Review of Darwin and His Critics – by Peter Medawar

1935 births
2010 deaths
American philosophers
Charles Darwin biographers
Deaths from pancreatic cancer
Indiana University alumni
Philosophers of science
University of Wisconsin–Milwaukee faculty
Northwestern University faculty
American gay writers
Writers from Chicago
Writers from Indiana
Writers from Wisconsin
Philosophers of biology
American LGBT scientists
Gay academics
Gay scientists
American LGBT rights activists
LGBT philosophers